The 5th Kuwaiti Federation Cup started on 5 September 2011.

The fifth Federation Cup is one of four competitions in the Kuwaiti 2011/2012 season. 14 clubs are taking part in the tournament.

They were divided into two groups of seven, and the winner and runner-up of each group will advance to the semi-finals.

Group stage

Group 1

Group 2

Semi-finals

1st Legs

2nd Legs

Final

Kuwait Federation Cup
2011–12 domestic association football cups
2011–12 in Kuwaiti football